Günter Oberhuber (22 April 1954 – 28 November 2021) was an Austrian ice hockey player. He competed in the men's tournament at the 1976 Winter Olympics.

References

1954 births
2021 deaths
Olympic ice hockey players of Austria
Ice hockey players at the 1976 Winter Olympics
Sportspeople from Innsbruck